Grand Prix Velo Alanya is the name of two cycling races:
Grand Prix Velo Alanya (men's race)
Grand Prix Velo Alanya (women's race)